Willow Lake is a lake in South Dakota, in the United States.

Willow Lake was named for the willow trees which lined its shores.

See also
List of lakes in South Dakota

References

Lakes of South Dakota
Lakes of Clark County, South Dakota